James Wilson (born 1948) is an American former professional basketball player. He played in the American Basketball Association in six games for the Pittsburgh Condors during the 1970–71 season.

References

1948 births
Living people
Cheyney Wolves men's basketball players
Chicago Bulls draft picks
Pittsburgh Condors draft picks
Pittsburgh Condors players
Point guards
American men's basketball players